Channa Horwitz (née Channa Helene Shapiro, aka "Channa Davis" and "Channa Davis Horwitz", May 21, 1932 – April 29, 2013) was a contemporary artist based in Los Angeles, United States. She is recognized for the logically derived compositions created over her five-decade career. Her visually complex, systematic works are generally structured around linear progressions using the number eight.

Early life and education
Horwitz was born in Boyle Heights, Los Angeles, on May 21, 1932; her father was an electrician and inventor. She studied at Art Center School of Design 1950–52. As a married mother of two, she studied painting at California State University Northridge (1960–63) while living in Tarzana. At CSUN she was encouraged by her instructors to paint in an Abstract Expressionist style, to "be free" and "throw the paint."  She had a third child before earning a B.F.A. in 1972 from CalArts, studying under teachers John Baldessari and Allan Kaprow, among others. She married her second husband, Jim Horwitz, in 1973.

Early work 
In 1964, already deconstructing form and doing large, hard-edged oil paintings, using limited motif and basic geometric shapes, Horwitz developed in sketches what came to be known as her "Language Series" body of work which she later began actualizing in 2003. She combined circles, squares and rectangles with sequential numbers, 1 through 8, to create compositions. Horwitz arranged these compositions into linear progressive patterns based on the corresponding numbers. She felt that by reducing the choices she had, she was able to search for the essence of form.  "As an artist I experience freedom through limitation and structure.  It would appear that limitation and structure are dichotomies to freedom, but through experience I have found them to be synonymous and the basis of freedom." This approach continued to inform her inquiry and subsequent bodies of work.

Also in 1964 Horwitz started a series of architectural interior renderings for a fictitious couple named, “Mr. and Mrs. McGillicutty.” Each rendering was composed of basic interior elements including a window and a window-blind. Horwitz lost interest in all other elements of the series, save for the varied positioning of the window-blinds. Altering the position of the blinds was another early indication of Horwitz's inquiry into systems and sequences and their variety of patterns.

Black and White, Circle and Square (1966): By 1966 She did away with all narrative pretexts and reduced her vocabulary to just black and white and the circle and the square. With four simple rules governing her process, Horwitz composed sixteen paintings in the Circle and Square series. The four rules were: “1) Randomly position two rectangles (on large one small) against a broad field. 2) Draw a circle around the circumference of each of the rectangles. 3) Draw a circle in the center of the entire frame. 4) Color the portion of each rectangle falling outside circle number 3 a darker shade.” 

In this manner Horwitz came to her own, self-derived, version of minimalism. In the early years of her practice, as she worked out her system of representation, Horwitz was fairly isolated and unfamiliar with Sol LeWitt and other conceptualists working in the same vein.

The Art and Technology exhibition and Sonakinatography
In 1968, Horwitz (then Channa Davis) submitted a proposal to the innovative exhibition Art and Technology (1971), in which artists were paired with technology companies and engineers, at the Los Angeles County Museum of Art.  The proposed sculpture consisted of "eight large clear Plexiglas beams designed to move and float in the air within magnetic fields, accompanied by eight beams of light that would vary in intensity based on the adjacent beam." The movement would occur in ten minute cycles. Although the sculpture was never fabricated, Horwitz's proposal was included in the 1970 program catalogue, whose cover prominently displayed the faces of the white male artists whose works appeared in the culminating exhibition at the Museum. Art and Technology's glaring omission of women—specifically the fact that Horwitz was never asked to speak with industry about the possibility of making her sculpture led to a public outcry in the feminist art community in Los Angeles,  involving confrontations and eventual concessions from the curator Maurice Tuchman.

Not long after submitting the Art and Technology proposal, Horwitz continued her interest in representing motion across time. She asked her then-husband for a break from a tennis match to spend two hours drawing, and during this period invented a system of composition called Sonakinatography, meaning sound – motion – notation. Sonakinatography plots the activity of eight entities over a period of time using numbers, colors, and the eight-to-the-inch squares of the graph paper they appear on. While conceptually complete ends in themselves, and visually appealing in their own right as standalone drawings, Sonakinatography compositions have also been performed via percussion,  dance, spoken word, lights, and electronic instruments.

Because of the initial choice of eight-to-the-inch graph paper for Sonakinatography, Horwitz has used the number eight consistently through her work, as she expands and varies her original systems into new sequences and series.

Subsequent bodies of work which were outgrowths of each prior series and her deepening inquiry, include "To the Top", "Variations and Inversion on a Rhythm", "Eight", "Canon Series", "Moiré", "Subliminal", "Variance", Rhythm of Lines", and "Angle of Lines" Series, "Design Series", and "Language Series l, ll, and lll".

Current representation
Although for the most part publicly ignored throughout her career, Horwitz's work has been gaining recognition in recent years.  She is currently represented by Ghebaly Gallery and Lisson Gallery. Horwitz has commented that this lack of public involvement has likely given her the freedom to pursue and question the directions in which the structures of her work take her.

She has recently had solo exhibitions at MUSAC, (León, Spain), Ghebaly Gallery (Los Angeles), Contemporary Art Gallery (Vancouver, Canada), Lisson Gallery (New York and London), Raven Row (London, England), KW Institute for Contemporary Art (Berlin), Air de Paris (France). She was included in group exhibitions at the Museum of Modern Art (New York), Inhotim (Brazil), Museum Tinguely (Switzerland), Los Angeles County Museum of Art, the Hammer Museum (Los Angeles), the New Museum (New York), ZKM Karlsruhe and Kunsthalle Dresden (Germany), and Centro Galego de Arte Contemporánea (Spain), the 55th Venice Biennale (2013), and the Whitney Biennial 2014.  She has upcoming events across the US and Europe.  She received the honor of a Guggenheim Fellowship shortly before her death in April, 2013.

Selected solo exhibitions
 2022: "Channa Horwitz". Lisson Gallery, Shanghai, China 
 2022: "Channa Horwitz", Lisson Gallery, New York, NY, USA 
 2021: "The Language Series", François Ghebaly, Los Angeles, CA, USA 
 2020: "Channa Horwitz", Lisson Gallery, East Hampton, NY, USA 
 2019: "Rules of the Game", Lisson Gallery, London, England 
 2018  "Channa Horwitz" Lisson Gallery, New YOrk, NY 
 2018: "The Factor Eight", MUSAC, Spain,  
 2018: "Structures", Ghebaly Gallery, Los Angeles, CA, 
 2018: "Channa Horwitz – Progressions and Rhythms in Eight", CAG, Vancouver, Canada 
 2018: "Sonakinatography", Lisson Gallery, New York, NY 
 2016: "Inbox: Channa Horwitz" The Museum of Modern Art, New York, NY 
 2016: "To the Top", Ghebaly Gallery, Los Angeles, CA 
 2016: "Channa Horwitz", Raven Row, London, England 
 2015: "Playing in Time", Air de Paris, Paris, France  
 2015: "Counting in Eight, Moving by Color, KW Institute for Contemporary Art, Berlin, Germany
 2013: "Orange Grid", François Ghebaly Gallery, Los Angeles, CA
 2012: "Poem Opera / The Divided Person", (Performance), High Line Park, New York, NY, USA
 2012: "Variations of Sonakinatography lll", Pacific Standard Time, The Annenberg, Los Angeles, CA, USA
 2011: "Displacement", curated by Marc Glöde, Y8, Hamburg
 2011: "What Would Happen If I", Aanant & Zoo, Berlin
 2010: "Hello is not like I would say goodbye" Aanant & Zoo, Berlin
 2010: "Sequences and Systems", SolwayJones, Los Angeles
 2009: "Variations in Counting One Through Eight", Brandenburgischer Kunstverein Potsdam e.V, Potsdam
 2009: "Searching/Structures 1960-2007", Aanant & Zoo, Berlin
 2007: "Variances", SolwayJones, Los Angeles
 2005: "Language Series", Solway Jones, Los Angeles, CA, USA 
 1999: "Structures", University of Judaism, Platt Gallery, Los Angeles, CA, USA
 1990: "Paintings’, The Drawing Room, Tucson, AZ, USA (curated by Malinda Wyatt)
 1988: "Paintings and Drawings", Los Angeles Municipal Art Gallery (LAMAG), Los Angeles
 1983: "Drawings and Prints", Malinda Wyatt Gallery, Venice, CA, USA
 1981: "Drawings and Prints", Malinda Wyatt Gallery, Venice, CA, USA
 1978: Performance, International Performance Palazzo de Congressi, Bologna, Italy
 1978: Performance, Ferrara, Sala Polivalente, Ferrara, Italy
 1978: Performance, California Institute of Technology, Pasadena, CA, USA
 1976: "Drawings and Performance", San Francisco Art Institute, San Francisco, CAUSA
 1976: "Drawings", Nevada Art Gallery, Reno, NV, USA
 1974: "Drawings", Woman’s Building, Los Angeles Drawings, University of California, Irvine, CA, USA
 1973: "Cal Arts, Orchestrated Stairwell 1 + 2", Performance, California Institute of the Arts, Valencia, USA
 1969" "Drawings, Sculptures, Multi-Media Performance’", Orlando Gallery, Encino,CA, USA
 1964: "Paintings and Drawings", Valley Center of Art, Encino, CA, USA
 1963: "Paintings", California State University Northridge, CA, USA

Selected group exhibitions
 2022: "FUTURA: Measuring Time", Hamburger Kunsthalle, Hamburg, Germany
 2021: "Recent Acquisitions: Modern and Contemporary Drawings and Prints", The Morgan Library, New York, NY, USA
 2020: "Selected Works", Lisson Gallery, London, UK
 2020: "The Botanical Mind: Art, Mysticism and the Cosmic Tree’, Camden Arts Centre, London, UK
 2020: "Spectrum", Lisson Gallery, New York, NY, USA
 2020: "Sound Art", Fundació Joan Miró, Barcelona, Spain
 2019: "Geste", Centre National Édition Art Image, Pantin, France
 2019: "Painted Diagrams: Bauhaus, Art and Infographic", Museum für Konkrete Kunst, Ingolstadt, Germany 
 2019: "Programmed: Rules, Codes, and Choreographies in Art, 1965–2018" Whitney Museum of American Art, New York, NY
 2017: "Thinking Machines: Art and Design in the Computer Age", 1959–1989, The Museum of Modern Art, New York, NY, US
 2017: "Strange Attractor" Ballroom Marfa, Marfa,Texas, US
 2016: "The Promise of Total Automation, Kunsthalle Wien, Vienna, Austria 
 2016: "Poésie Balistique, La Verriére, Bruxelles, Belgium
 2016: "Drawing Dialogues: The Sol Lewitt Collection", The Drawing Center, New York, NY, US
 2016: "Performing the Grid", Otis College of Art and Design, Los Angeles, US
 2015: "Haroon Mirza/hrm199 Ltd.", Museum Tinguely, Basel, Switzerland
 2015: "Drawing in L.A.: The 1960s and 70s", Los Angeles County Museum of Art
 2015: "From the Archives: Art and Technology at LACMA, 1967–1971", Los Angeles County Museum of Art
 2015: "Do Objeto para o Mundo", a touring exhibition of The Centro de Arte Contemporânea Inhotim, Brazil
 2014: "Lines" Hauser & Wirth, Zurich, Switzerland
 2014: "Whitney Biennial, 2014", NYC, New York
 2013: "55th Venice Biennale", Venice, Italy
 2012: "Ghosts in the Machine", New Museum, New York
 2012: "Made in L.A", Hammer Museum, Los Angeles
 2012: "Papier / Papier II", Kunstgaleriebonn, Bonn
 2012: "Systems and Structures", Galerie Casas Riegner, Bogota
 2012: "How To Make – Ideen, Notationen, Materialisierungen", Kunsthaus Dresden, Dresden
 2012: "Moments, Eine Geschichte der Performance in 10 Akten", ZKM Karlsruhe, Karlsruhe
 2012: "Hanne Darboven und Channa Horwitz", Galerie Crone, Berlin
 2008: "Zero", Aanant & Zoo, Berlin

References 

1932 births
2013 deaths
American artists